Huaros District is one of seven districts of the province Canta in Peru.

Geography 
Other mountains are listed below:

References